The J.League awards are represented by a ceremony, which is hosted every year in December, at the end of the season. This ceremony was inducted to award the best players of J.League. To win this award, the nominees had to play at least 17 matches of the season. All awards are updated to 2021''.

Player of the Year

The J.League Player of the Year (formerly known as the "J.League Most Valuable Player Award" from 1993 to 2020) is awarded by the J.League to the most valuable player of the season.

Top scorer

The J.League Top Scorer is awarded by the J.League to the top scoring player of the season.

Only five players won this award twice: Masashi Nakayama, Ryoichi Maeda, Joshua Kennedy and Yoshito Okubo. Other four players won both the top-scorer award and the one for Most Valuable Player: Masashi Nakayama in 1998, Naohiro Takahara in 2002, Marquinhos in 2008, Hisato Sato in 2012 and Yu Kobayashi in 2017.

Best XI

Best Young Player

The J.League Best Young Player (formerly known as the "J.League Rookie of the Year" from 1993 to 2019) is awarded by the J.League to the most outstanding rookie of the season. To be considered a rookie, there are some criteria to meet:

 a player must be in his first professional year of football (domestically or abroad);
 a player must have played more than half of the season;
 in date 2 April of the incumbent season, he has to be under 21 years old;
 whoever has already won this award, he's excluded from running for it again.

The youngest-ever winner is Takayuki Morimoto: he won the award in 2004 at the age of 16.

Players names shown in bold were also named in the best eleven for that season.

Manager of the year

The J.League Manager of the Year is an annual award given to one manager by the J.League based on their performance during the season.  In the past, the award usually went to the manager of the champions, though this has varied somewhat over the years. From 2017, the award was modified so that the Manager of the J.League champion wins the J.League Champion Manager of the Year, and a separate J.League Manager of the Year award is given to a Manager from each of the J.Leagues (J1, J2 and J3). The list below reflects the award for J1 League Manager of the Year award only.

Monthly Most Valuable Player (Monthly MVP)

Goal of the Year

J1 League winners

J2 League winners

J3 League winners

Fair Play Award
The goal is to be under the 1 point-media to win the award. For J.League the limit is 34, while in J.League 2 and J3 League the limit is respectively 42 and 33.
In bold the winners of Prince Takamado Cup.

Individual Fair Play Award

This award was established since 1996.

Referees of the Year

References

J.League trophies and awards